Rolling Papers is the debut mixtape by American rapper Domo Genesis. The mixtape was self-released for free on Odd Future's Tumblr page on August 30, 2010. The mixtape's production was handled by Left Brain, Syd tha Kyd, and Tyler, the Creator.

Reception
Pitchfork Media on the album: "Rolling Papers peaks high with "Super Market", a skit-song in which Domo cuts off Tyler in a grocery-store line, leading to an epically ridiculous battle-rap throwdown that ends when Tyler leaves on an evil walrus named Rufus and Domo turns into a zombie. Deep-voiced, sleepy-eyed Domo doesn't have the magnetic bloodlust of the rest of the crew; most of the time, he just wants to puff away in peace. The production is dazed, MF Doom-esque psych-rap—good for vibe, not close attention—and Domo's voice, usually deep in the mix, works just the same. If you're in the right mood, Rolling Papers wafts past nicely. If you're not, things get boring fast."

Track listing

Notes
 "First Roll" features uncredited vocals by L-Boy and Jasper Dolphin
 "Drunk" features uncredited vocals by Tyler, the Creator and Hodgy Beats
 "Last Roll" features uncredited vocals by Bob Marley

Personnel
Credits adapted from Discogs.
 Domo Genesis - vocals and songwriting on all tracks
 Tyler, the Creator - production on tracks 1, 2, 4–8, 10, 11 and 13; guest vocals on tracks 4 and 9; additional vocals on tracks 2, 7, 10, and 12
 Hodgy Beats - guest vocals on tracks 7 and 12; additional vocals on track 10
 Left Brain - production on tracks 3, 9 and 12
 Frank Ocean - backing vocals on track 7
 Syd Tha Kyd - co-production on track 5, additional vocals on track 9

Notes

References

External links 
 Rolling Papers on Odd Future Tumblr
 Odd Future Website
 Domo Genesis on Tumblr
 

Albums produced by Tyler, the Creator
Albums produced by Left Brain
2010 mixtape albums
Cannabis music
Debut mixtape albums